MTM Records was an American independent record label specializing in country music. It was founded in 1984 as a subsidiary of the production company of the same name owned by actress Mary Tyler Moore.

Howard Stark was the label's President, and Tommy West, originally of the musical duo Cashman and West, was Senior Vice President (both Stark and West worked together at ABC Records in the 1970s); staff songwriters included Radney Foster and Bill Lloyd of Foster & Lloyd, as well as Larry Boone and Hugh Prestwood.

In its four years of existence, fifty-one singles on the MTM label charted on the Billboard country singles chart. The label also signed three rock music acts: The Metros from Minneapolis, Minnesota, who were discovered on Star Search; In Pursuit, a New Wave rock group, and The Voltage Brothers, a family R&B act from Philadelphia. None of those groups' output charted.

After MTM Enterprises was sold to Britain's Television South PLC in July 1988, the label was purchased by and absorbed into RCA Nashville. Becky Hobbs, Paul Overstreet, and Judy Rodman were then transferred to RCA's roster. Holly Dunn signed with Warner Bros. Nashville, and her MTM masters went with her (Warner Bros. re-released the original MTM hit version of Dunn's hit, "Daddy's Hands," as the B-side of her 1991 single "Maybe I Mean Yes"). The Girls Next Door signed with Atlantic Records, but their MTM hits are still owned by RCA.

Artist roster
The Almost Brothers
The Debonaires
Holly Dunn
Girls Next Door
Marty Haggard
Hege V
Becky Hobbs
In Pursuit
The Metros
Paul Overstreet
Judy Rodman
Ronnie Rogers
S-K-O
The Shoppe
The Voltage Brothers

References

External links
Trisha Yearwood, receptionist with MTM Records

American country music record labels
American independent record labels
Record labels established in 1984
Record labels disestablished in 1988
MTM Enterprises